Matthieu Huard (born 9 May 1998) is a French professional footballer who plays as a left back for Italian Serie B club Brescia.

Career
Huard is a youth product of Rennes having joined at the age of 8, and on 18 July 2019 transferred to AC Ajaccio. He made his professional debut with Ajaccio in a 2–2 Ligue 2 tie with Le Havre AC on 26 July 2019.

On 4 September 2021, he signed with Brescia in Italy.

References

External links
 
 
 Stade-Rennais Profile

1998 births
Living people
Sportspeople from Neuilly-sur-Seine
Association football fullbacks
French footballers
AC Ajaccio players
Brescia Calcio players
Ligue 2 players
Championnat National 2 players
Championnat National 3 players
French expatriate footballers
Expatriate footballers in Italy
French expatriate sportspeople in Italy
Footballers from Hauts-de-Seine